William King (born January 30, 1949) is an American singer, musician and choreographer. He is a founding member of the Commodores, where he plays trumpet, guitar, synthesizer, flute, and congas/percussion and is the group's choreographer.

Background
King was born in Birmingham, Alabama. After college, he considered playing tennis professionally but decided to continue his career with the Commodores. King was also hired by a digital computer company to write software but gave that up as well to join the band.

King's compositions include "Lady" and "I'm In Love", both of which he co-composed with Harold Hudson and one other. The latter was the B side to their single "Janet" which was released in 1985.

Personal life
King married his songwriting partner and fellow Grammy Award nominee, Shirley Hanna-King in 1976 and they have four children.

References

1949 births
Living people
Musicians from Birmingham, Alabama
Commodores members
African-American musicians
American trumpeters
American male trumpeters
21st-century trumpeters
21st-century American male musicians